No Jae-wook (Hangul: 노재욱; born  in Gwangju) is a South Korean male volleyball player. He is part of the South Korea men's national volleyball team. On club level he plays the setter position for Seoul Woori Card Wibee.

Career

Clubs
In the 2014 V-League Draft, No was selected third overall by the LIG Greaters.

After having a mediocre rookie season in the Greaters, No was traded to the Hyundai Capital Skywalkers in 2015. No earned the starting spot for the Skywalkers in the 2015–16 season, racking up 1,179 total assists and averaging 10.72 per set. 
 
In the 2016–17 season, No won his first championship, setting the Skywalkers to their third V-League title.

National team
In 2010 No got called up to the South Korean national under-18 team for the 2010 Asian Youth Championship where his team won the bronze medal. During the tourney, he mostly served as the backup setter to Lee Min-gyu.

In May 2017 No was first selected for the South Korean senior national team to compete at the 2017 FIVB World League. After finishing the World League in 18th place, he also took part in the 2017 Asian Championship, where South Korea won the bronze medal.

External links
 No Jae-wook at the International Volleyball Federation (FIVB)

1992 births
Living people
South Korean men's volleyball players
Hampyeong No clan
Sportspeople from Gwangju
21st-century South Korean people